Charles Mainor (born January 23, 1967) is an American Democratic Party politician who served in the New Jersey General Assembly representing the 31st Legislative District. Mainor is a police detective in Jersey City. He succeeded L. Harvey Smith, who did not seek re-election in 2009.

Mainor graduated from New Jersey City University with a B.S. degree in criminal justice. He ran unsuccessfully for the Hudson County Board of Chosen Freeholders twice before his election to the Assembly in 2009.

Legislative career
In the Assembly, Mainor served as chair of the Law and Public Safety Committee. He was also a member of the Consumer Affairs Committee, Transportation and Independent Authorities Committee, and the Joint Committee on Housing Affordability.

After being easily re-elected in 2011 and 2013, Mainor originally sought re-election to the Assembly in the June 2015 despite losing the support of the Hudson County Democratic Committee and Jersey City Mayor Steve Fulop. Ultimately, he dropped out before the Democratic primary election.

References

Living people
1967 births
African-American state legislators in New Jersey
New Jersey City University alumni
Democratic Party members of the New Jersey General Assembly
Politicians from Jersey City, New Jersey
American police detectives
21st-century American politicians
21st-century African-American politicians
20th-century African-American people